WMNA-FM (106.3 FM) is a commercial radio station licensed to Gretna, Virginia, serving Northern Pittsylvania County and the suburbs of the Lynchburg metropolitan area.  WMNA-FM is owned and operated by 3 Daughters Media,  It simulcasts a talk radio format with sister station 100.9 WIQO-FM Forest, Virginia.

WMNA-FM has an effective radiated power (ERP) of 6,000 watts.  It has a construction permit to increase its ERP to 15,000 watts and raise its height above average terrain (HAAT) to better cover the Lynchburg metropolitan area.  Programming is also heard on 250-watt FM translator W227BG 93.3 MHz in Timberlake, Virginia.

Programming
Weekday mornings on WIQO-FM and WMNA-FM begin with a local wake up show hosted by Janet Rose, also shared with co-owned WGMN.  The rest of the weekday schedule is nationally syndicated talk programs:  The Hugh Hewitt Show, The Tom Sullivan Show, The Lars Larson Show, CBS Eye on the World with John Batchelor, Red Eye Radio,  This Morning, America's First News with  Gordon Deal and The Markley, Van Camp and Robbins Show.  

Weekends feature shows on money, home repair, cars, guns and real estate.  Syndicated hosts include Ben Ferguson, Rick Valdes, John Catsimatidis and Our American Stories with Lee Habeeb.  Most hours begin with an update from CBS Radio News.

History
It was originally powered at 3,000 watts and was a full-time simulcast of co-owned WMNA 730 AM. At the time, WMNA 730 was a daytimer, required to go off the air at night. So listeners with an FM radio could continue to hear programming on 106.3 FM.
</ref>  The two stations were owned by the Central Virginia Broadcasting Company and were network affiliates of the Mutual Broadcasting System. 

WMNA-FM was a country music station, before being bought by Gary Burns.  The station became a simulcast of Lynchburg's WLNI to extend the signal along Route 29 from Danville to Nelson County.  When Burns sold WLNI to Centennial Broadcasting, he split WMNA and sold it to Three Daughters Media.  It became a sports radio station as an ESPN Radio affiliate.

In November 2013 WMNA-FM switched from sports to talk radio.  It began sharing programming with co-owned WIQO-FM 106.3 MHz.

Translator
In addition to the main station, WMNA-FM is relayed by an FM translator to widen its broadcast area.

References

External links
100.9 WIQO Online

MNA-FM
Talk radio stations in the United States
Radio stations established in 1950